Halil İbrahim Zıraman (1927-1984) was a javelin thrower from Turkey, who twice competed for his native country at the Summer Olympics in 1948 and 1952.

Halil İbrahim was born 1927 in Zıraman village of Kula district in Manisa Province. He finished the elementary school in his village, and the secondary school in Simav. He graduated from the Agricultural Machinery Vocational College in Ankara following his education at the Agriculture Vocational High School in Bornova, İzmir.

He began with javelin sport in 1947 at the high school in İzmir. Zıraman set his first national record on June 20, 1948, with 60.28 m. He improved his records four times, and set his personal best  with 65.41 m on August 24, 1949.

Zıraman, who was also active in discus throwing and shot put events, retired in 1957. He died in 1984 due to heart failure.

He was a member of the Fenerbahçe Athletics team.

Achievements

References

External links
 sports-reference

1927 births
People from Kula, Manisa
Turkish male javelin throwers
Fenerbahçe athletes
Athletes (track and field) at the 1948 Summer Olympics
Athletes (track and field) at the 1952 Summer Olympics
Olympic athletes of Turkey
1984 deaths
Mediterranean Games silver medalists for Turkey
Athletes (track and field) at the 1951 Mediterranean Games
Mediterranean Games medalists in athletics